The Riddell District Football Netball League (RDFNL) is  an Australian rules football and netball league in Victoria, Australia. The RDFNL covers towns in the Macedon Ranges and an area from Rockbank in the south to Broadford in the north.

The league also runs junior competitions from Under 10 to Under 18 age groups.

Brief history

1970s
This decade saw Hesket club go into recess and the introduction of new clubs Craigieburn, Melton and Melton South. In 1975 the league went two divisional, With eight teams in First Division and six clubs in Second Division. Numbers were boosted by the return of Trentham and Hesket clubs. 1977 saw Broadford and a second team from Sunbury join the league. Diggers Rest joined in 1978.

1980s
1985 saw the league return to one division with twelve clubs. In 1987 the league went two divisional again as clubs were admitted from the Panton Hill Football League and North Fawkner from the disbanded YCW league the league had nineteen clubs.

1990s
By the mid-1990s some clubs were struggling to compete and clubs went into recess.

The strongest clubs, Darley, Melton, Melton South & Sunbury left for the Ballarat Football League in 1998. This reduced the league to one division again. North Fawkner went into recess after 1998 after the club struggled for years to secure sufficient numbers to field 2 teams, which resulted in many large defeats many over 30 goals.

2000s
 Gisborne decided to play in the Bendigo Football League from 2000. 
 Macedon went into recess for 2001 and 2002. Due to this it was thought that the league was becoming no longer viable.
 Wallan FC left for the Diamond Valley Football League in 2002. After a restructure the Riddell District Football League stabilised.
 2008 saw Wallan FC return.
 2009 saw Broadford FC recommence in the League.

2010s
Rupertswood joined in full in 2013. It had been fielding juniors for some years. The senior side transferred in from the VAFA.
Kilmore transferred to the Northern Football League in 2016.
Sunbury Kangaroos transferred to the Essendon District Football League from 2019.

2020s
 2020 saw Broadford FC transfer to the AFL Outer East League.
 2021 saw Rupertswood FC transfer to the Essendon District Football League

Clubs

Current

Former
Broadford Football Club
Craigieburn Football Club
Darley Football Club
Gisborne Football Club
Hesket Football Club
Jacana Football Club
Kilmore Football Club
Melton Football Club
Melton South Football Club
Moomba Park Football Club
North Fawkner Football Club
 Rupertswood Football Club
Sunbury Football Netball Club
Sunbury Kangaroos Football Club
Trentham Football Club
Woodend Football Club

Premiers

1912 Riddell
1913 Sunbury
1914 Woodend
1915 Sunbury
1919 Macedon
1920 Romsey
1921 Romsey
1922 Sunbury
1923 Lancefield
1924 Lancefield
1925 Romsey
1926 Romsey
1927 Romsey
1928 Romsey
1929 Romsey
1930 Woodend
1931 Woodend
1932 Lancefield
1933 Romsey
1934 Gisborne
1935 Romsey
1936 Romsey
1937 Woodend
1938 Romsey
1939 Romsey
World War 2
1946 Lancefield
1947 Riddell
1948 Romsey
1949 Lancefield
1950 Romsey
1951 Romsey
1952 Lancefield

1953 Sunbury
1954 Woodend 
1955 Sunbury
1956	Trentham
1957	Sunbury
1958	Lancefield
1959	Trentham
1960	Hesket
1961	Trentham
1962	Gisborne
1963	Romsey
1964	Woodend
1965	Gisborne
1966	Lancefield
1967	Gisborne
1968	Romsey
1969	Sunbury
1970	Riddell
1971	Kilmore
1972	Gisborne
1973	Melton
1974	Sunbury
1975	Gisborne
1976	Sunbury
1977	Sunbury
1978	Gisborne
1979	Gisborne
1980	Sunbury
1981	Melton
1982	Sunbury
1983	Melton
1984	Melton
1985	Wallan 
1986	Melton
1987	Sunbury
1988	Sunbury
1989	Darley
1990	Sunbury
1991	Riddell
1992	Riddell
1993	Craigieburn
1994	Melton South
1995	Darley
1996	Sunbury
1997	Gisborne
1998	Gisborne
1999	Gisborne
2000	Jacana
2001	Kilmore
2002	Woodend/Hesket
2003	Romsey
2004	Lancefield
2005	Riddell
2006	Riddell
2007	Woodend/Hesket
2008   Riddell
2009   Lancefield
2010   Riddell
2011   Romsey
2012   Sunbury Kangaroos
2013 Riddell
2014 Romsey
2015 Romsey
2016 Diggers Rest
2017 Macedon
2018 Diggers Rest
2019 Rupertswood
2020 League in recess due to COVID19 pandemic 
2021 Wallan* recognised as minor premier with seasoncut short due to COVID19 pandemic
2022 Riddell

Division 2
1975 Romsey
1976 Macedon
1977 Wallan
1978 Woodend/Hesket
1979 Craigieburn
1980 Riddell
1981 Broadford
1982 Riddell
1983 Woodend/Hesket
1984 Broadford
1987 Kilmore
1988 Northern Eagles
1989 Wallan
1990 Riddell
1991 Moomba Park
1992 Wallan
1993 Diggers Rest
1994 Kilmore
1995 Lancefield
1996 Lancefield

2015 Ladder

2016 Ladder

2017 Ladder

2018 Ladder

2019 Ladder

References

Bibliography
 History of Football in the Bendigo District by John Stoward - 
 100 years of Football in the Riddell District by John Stoward

External links
 SportsTG site

Australian rules football competitions in Victoria (Australia)
Riddell District Football League
Netball leagues in Victoria (Australia)